Thomas Rich (born c. 1940), generally known as Tom Rich, is an Australian palaeontologist. He is, as of 2019, Senior Curator of Vertebrate Palaeontology at Museums Victoria.

Education and career
He was a student of  Professor Ruben Arthur Stirton. This pushed him to become aware of potential in Australia to make fundamental discoveries about mammalian evolution
He graduated in 1973 from Columbia University in New York City with a P.h.D. in Geology.

Career and professional positions
Rich is a trained Vertebrate paleontologist at University of California, Berkeley and Columbia University.

Publications
Three decades, 37 bones: the long hunt for Victorian Dinosaurs. Thomas H. Rich and Roger Benson

Personal life
Thomas H. Rich was born on May 30, 1941 in the United States. Rich is married to palaeontologist Patricia Arlene Vickers-Rich. Together the couple described the dinosaur genera Leaellynasaura and Timimus, naming them after their daughter and son, Leaellyn and Tim Rich, respectively.

Thomas Rich is also honored in the epithet of the ancient thylacinid species Nimbacinus richi.

References

Living people
Australian paleontologists
Year of birth missing (living people)